College Access Now (CAN) is a non-profit organization based in Seattle. Its mission is to empower students from low-income families to access, enroll, and graduate from college at rates equal to their more advantaged peers. 94% of CAN's students are the first in their families to pursue a college degree.

Overview and Mission
CAN was founded in 2005 and initially served 29 high school students at Garfield High School. The organization has expanded to serve high school juniors and seniors at six high schools in Seattle, and now also provides support to its students through college graduation. CAN now serves 960 students: 560 high school students and 400 high school graduates and college students.

Low-income, first-generation students face many barriers to college admission and graduation. Nationally, low-income, first-generation students are nearly four times more likely to leave college after their first year than students who have neither of these risk factors, and enroll in college at a rate of only 52% (compared to 82% of high-income high school graduates).

Activities and Success
Through its high school program, CAN's staff works with juniors and seniors to help them identify colleges, prepare for standardized tests, and complete college and financial aid applications. Since its founding, 97% of CAN students have been accepted to at least one college, and 85% have enrolled in college.

In 2012, CAN launched its College Persistence Program which offers formal support to students for up to six years of post-secondary education. Its summer support series "Campus Ready!" helps CAN's high school graduates build skills to succeed in college.

CAN's team of 20 AmeriCorps members forms the core of the high school and college persistence programs. As part of this national service program, AmeriCorps members commit to serving 1700 hours of service over a 10- or 12-month term. During their service at CAN, members build one-on-one relationships with students, mentor them through the college application process, and help them overcome other obstacles on their way to a college degree.

CAN's work has been recognized on a regional level. In March 2014, CAN was recognized in the Community Center for Education Results' Road Map Project Award Program as one of seven organizations to receive a Special Recognition Award for "working to advance equity and reduce opportunity gaps in the Road Map region of King County."

History 
College Access Now (CAN) was started by Julia Schechter at Garfield High School in 2005.  Schechter served as founding Executive Director and Board Chair until 2008. A community volunteer who lived not far from Garfield, Schechter wanted to use her background in education to address the inequities between high and low-wealth neighborhoods living side-by-side. The program was based on the idea that higher education is a path out of poverty, yet college admissions favors the children of college graduates and the process for applying to college is complicated and biased against those that don't understand it.  The CAN program was initially supported by Garfield GEAR UP Director Randy Riley and Principal Ted Howard who agreed to make the computer lab available after school for use by CAN students to complete college applications.  Schechter started the program by writing an application for a full-time AmeriCorps VISTA to help run and build the program.  The first VISTA, Karly Feria,  stayed with CAN for two years and was joined by other AmeriCorps members.  The initial VISTA cost $3,500 and was paid for by the Garfield PTSA.   The program was incorporated as a 501(c)(3) organization on December 19, 2006.  The first major grant came from the Fordham Street Foundation in May 2006 for $40,000 over two years and enabled the hiring of staff.  CAN expanded to Franklin High School in 2008 supported by a grant from College Spark.

Early press for CAN included a 2006 feature in the Christian Science Monitor, and a 2007 Op-Ed in the Seattle Post-Intelligencer.

References

Organizations based in Seattle